Ilex florifera is a species of plant in the family Aquifoliaceae. It is endemic to Jamaica.

References

florifera
Vulnerable plants
Endemic flora of Jamaica
Taxonomy articles created by Polbot